Imbi Hoop (born 15 December 1988) is an Estonian football player who plays as a goalkeeper. She represented the Estonia national team from 2010 to 2016.

References

External links

1988 births
Living people
Women's association football goalkeepers
Estonian women's footballers
Estonia women's international footballers
Pärnu JK players
FC Levadia Tallinn (women) players